"Cold Sweat" is a song performed by James Brown and written with his bandleader Alfred "Pee Wee" Ellis. Brown recorded it in May 1967. An edited version of "Cold Sweat" released as a two-part single on King Records was a No. 1 R&B hit, and reached number seven on the Pop Singles chart. The complete recording, more than seven minutes long, was included on an album of the same name.

Brown's lyrics describe how his woman's affections make him "break out in a cold sweat."

In 2016 James Brown's "Cold Sweat" was inducted into the Grammy Hall of Fame.

Creation
"Cold Sweat" developed from an earlier James Brown R&B song, "I Don't Care", recorded in 1962 and first released on the album Tour the U.S.A.. According to Brown, "it was a slow, bluesy tune then. It was good that way, but I was really getting into my funk bag now, and it became an almost completely different tune, except for the lyrics." Arranger and co-composer Pee Wee Ellis recalled in an interview that

Analysis
Building on the innovations of Brown's earlier songs "Out of Sight" and "Papa's Got a Brand New Bag", "Cold Sweat" was a watershed event in the evolution of funk music. While those songs were both based on a conventional twelve bar blues chord progression, "Cold Sweat" has only one definite chord change, a move to the subtonic at the bridge. As in the earlier songs, all the band's instruments (horns, guitars, etc.) are used percussively in "Cold Sweat", and overwhelming emphasis is put on the first beat of each measure ("on the one"). The main drum part is a two-bar pattern with a snare hit on the two and four beats (a standard 4/4 rock pattern) with a simple variation: the four beat hit in the first measure is delayed by one eighth note. This snare pattern contributed greatly to the funky feel of the arrangement. It was copied, often with embellishments, in later James Brown songs and numerous songs by other musical artists.

"Cold Sweat" is the first recording in which Brown calls for a drum solo (with the famous exclamation "give the drummer some") from Clyde Stubblefield, beginning the tradition of rhythmic "breaks" that would become important in dance music and form the foundation of sampling. It also features a saxophone solo by Maceo Parker.

Impact
Sometimes cited as the first true funk song, "Cold Sweat" was recognized as a radical departure from pop music conventions at the time of its release. Producer Jerry Wexler recalled that "[it] deeply affected the musicians I knew. It just freaked them out. No one could get a handle on what to do next." Cliff White described it as "divorced from all other forms of popular music."  Some musicians criticized it as simplistic. Fred Wesley recalled that before he joined Brown's band he "was very unimpressed with ['Cold Sweat']. . . It only had one change, the words made no sense at all, and the bridge was musically incorrect." For the critic Dave Marsh, while acknowledging the song as pivotal, has suggested that "the post-'Cold Sweat' de-emphasis of melody" was partly responsible for a "decline in the number of genuinely memorable songs" in the years since its release.

Brown would continue to develop the rhythmically intense, harmonically static template pioneered on "Cold Sweat" in later recordings such as "I Can't Stand Myself (When You Touch Me)  ", "I Got the Feelin'", "Mother Popcorn", "Get Up (I Feel Like Being a) Sex Machine", and "Super Bad".

Like many of Brown's funk hits, "Cold Sweat" has been extensively sampled by hip hop DJs and producers.
The guitar riff would later be used in "Mother Popcorn" and "I Know You Got Soul".
Two instrumental incarnations of this song were "Bringing Up The Guitar" and "The Popcorn".

Other recordings
Live performances of "Cold Sweat" appear on the albums Live at the Apollo, Volume II (1968), Say It Live and Loud: Live in Dallas 08.26.68 (1998), Live in New York (1981), Soul Session Live (1989), and Live at the Apollo 1995 (1995). Brown re-recorded the song in a jazz-inflected version with the Dee Felice Trio for his 1969 album Gettin' Down to It, and again with his band for the 1972 album Get on the Good Foot.

"Cold Sweat" has been covered by a number of performers, notably by Mongo Santamaría in 1968.

Personnel
James Brown – lead vocal

with the James Brown Orchestra:
 Waymon Reed – trumpet
 Joe Dupars – trumpet
 Levi Rasbury – trombone
 Alfred "Pee Wee" Ellis – alto saxophone
 Maceo Parker – tenor saxophone
 Eldee Williams – tenor saxophone
 St. Clair Pinckney – baritone saxophone
 Jimmy Nolen – guitar
 Alphonso "Country" Kellum – guitar
 Bernard Odum – bass
 Clyde Stubblefield – drums

Chart positions

Mono track listing
1. "Cold Sweat"

2. "Let Yourself Go"

3. "Good Rockin' Tonight"

References

External links
 List of songs that sample "Cold Sweat"
 [ "Cold Sweat" song review from allmusic.com]

James Brown songs
Songs written by James Brown
1967 singles
Funk songs
Songs written by Alfred "Pee Wee" Ellis
Sampled drum breaks
1967 songs
King Records (United States) singles